Giants in the Land is a children's picture book written by Diana Appelbaum and illustrated by Michael McCurdy.  It was published by Houghton Mifflin Company in 1993.

Plot
The story tells of tall white pine trees, trees "that stood taller than an apartment house 25 stories high, taller than the tallest building ever built in New Hampshire or Maine. Giant pine trees that had grown in the New England woods for thousands of years."  

Michael McCurdy's black and white scratchboard illustrations give drama to the text.

Awards
 Booklist, Top of the List, best juvenile nonfiction book for Youth
 Jefferson Cup – Virginia Library Association 1994 Honor Book
 Starred reviews in Publishers Weekly, Booklist, and Kirkus Reviews
 School Library Journal Best Book
 The Bulletin (Blue Ribbon winner)
 Yankee Magazine, 40 Classic New England Children's Books.
 An ALA Notable Book for Children

References

1993 children's books
American picture books
Children's history books